Jogen Chowdhury (born 19 February 1939) is an eminent Indian painter and considered an important painter of 21st century India. He lives and works in Santiniketan. He graduated from the Government College of Art & Craft, Kolkata and subsequently at École nationale supérieure des Beaux-Arts, Paris in 1967. He has immense contribution in inspiring young artists of India. Jogen Chowdhury had developed his individual style after his return from Paris. His most famous paintings are in ink, water colour and pastel. He has painted in oil medium as well.

Lines and its tactile characteristic to enhance colours is an important material in Indian Art for ages. Jogen Chowdhury himself is a master of lines and he has mastered to make the curves depict the character of his figures. By careful distortion of the form he imparts the air of caricature in his figures, figures of men and women. The figure is always the most important and conveys all the artist has to express. Colour, he uses though, is to provide matter into the form. R. Siva Kumar has lucidly described Jogen's works in the following excerpt:"The pulse and rhythm of Jogen Chowdhury’s art comes from a filial affinity to nature and milieu. In Chowdhury’s more recent works the sensory experiences of cloth, bolsters, sofas and the human body are cross-projected to produce an uncanny world of tran-substantiated tumescence and flaccidness. Mnemic displacements and personal associations add to the symbolic ambivalence of his motifs, making his images come closer to inexplicable experiences than to explicit signs. In the postures of some figures we feel an animal sentience, in the ripe anatomy of others we savour a fruity succulence. The figures are wrought by a combination of decorative wilfulness and expressive distortion and are imbued with an effusive sensuality. Chowdhury’s art is rich in suggestions; it is to be apprehended without bracketing our fund of knowledge, experience or memories, but also cannot be narrativised without trivialising it, without depleting its sensory particularities."

Biography

Early life and education
Jogen was born in Daharpara Village, a village in the Faridpur district of Bangladesh in 1939. His father Pramatha Nath Chowdhury was a Brahmin zamindar. Jogen received the interest on art from his parents as both his parents were artists. Pramatha Nath was interested in Hindu mythological incidents and characters. He had painted several mythological scenes from the village theatres. He had also sculpted various Hindu deities.
Jogen's mother was an expert in Alpana drawings.

Jogen Chowdhury was born and brought-up in a village culture and atmosphere. Just before partition Jogen along with his father came to Calcutta; the rest of the family moved to Calcutta in 1948, after the partition. The family stayed at his uncle's quarter. Here Jogen painted his first painting, on the wall.

In 1951, Jogen's family moved to Saheednagar Colony, Dhakuria.

Jogen was admitted to the Government College of Art & Craft, Kolkata in 1955 wherefrom he graduated by 1960. His first job was as an art teacher in Howrah Zilla School. After two years in 1962, he was employed as Designer in the Handloom Board, Calcutta.

His youth
In 1965, he went to Paris to study in Ecole des Beaux Arts, in William Hayter's Atelier 17. Afterwards he spent five months in London.

He returned to India in early 1968. He was appointed as a textile designer in the Handloom Board in Chennai. In 1970, he joined the Calcutta Painters Group. His first collection of poems Hridoy Train Beje Othey was also published in the same year.

He quit his job at the Madras Handloom Board in 1972 to join the Art Gallery of Rashtrapati Bhavan, New Delhi as a Curator. Due to this new job, he moved to New Delhi. He founded the Gallery 26 and Artists' Forum in New Delhi in 1975 along with some leading painters of New Delhi. In 1986, Jogen represented India in the 'Festival of Art' in Baghdadwi.

Santiniketan
In 1987, Jogen Chowdhury joined Kala Bhavan, Santiniketan as professor of painting. Beside his numerous paintings, exhibitions, he has written extensively on contemporary art. He was also appointed as Juror in several exhibitions.

Awards and honors 

 Awarded by the Prix le France de la Jeune Peinture, Paris (1966), 
 Awarded at the 2nd Biennale of Havana, Cuba (1986),
 Awarded at the International Print Biennale, Bhopal (1995),
 Honored with the prestigious Kalidas Samman by the Government of Madhya Pradesh, (2001),
An honorary D. Litt by Rabindra Bharati University (2010),
Awarded by the Banga Bibhushan award by the Government of West Bengal (2012), 
Honored by the Zainul Samman (2016) by Dhaka University, Bangladesh.

Publications 

 The Arts of India, by Basil Grey, Phaidon (1981),
 Image and Imagination by Geeti Sen, Mapin (1996),
 Jogen Chowdhury Chitrakala (Bengali), Arun Sen (1996),
 Indian Contemporary Art: Post Independence, Vadehra Art Gallery (1997),
 Major Trends in Indian Art, Lalit Kala Akademi (1997),
 The Flamed Mosaic, Indian Contemporary Painting by Neville Neville Tuli, HEART (1997),
 Dreams 1900-2000, edited by Lynn Gamwell, Cornell University Press (2000),
 When Was Modernism, by Gaeta Kapur, Tulika (2000),
 Indian Art, by Partha Mitter, Oxford (2001),
 A Special Issue on Jogen Chowdhury (Bengali), Nandimukh Publication (2002),
Contemporary Art of Bengal, Mapin (2003),
Indian Art: An Overview, edited by Gayatri Sinha, Rupa & Co. (2003),
Ten Contemporary Artists of Bengal (Bengali) Pratikshan (2003),
Jogen Chowdhury Enigmatic Visions, published by Glenbarra Art Museum, collected works from exhibitions at Pundole Art Gallery, Mumbai, Vadehra Art Gallery, New Delhi, Chitrakoot Art Gallery, Kolkata (2006)
Jo 2021, Published by Debovasa (September ,2021) 
Jogen Chowdhury Sketchbook 1986-87 , Published by Debovasa (February, 2023) 
Jogen Chowdhury Sketchbook 1962, Published by Debovasa (March, 2023)

Political career
In 2014, Jogen Chowdhury has been elected as a member of Rajya Sabha from Trinamool Congress.

References
5.Retrospective exhibition of Jogen Chowdhury at National Gallery of Modern Art, Bangalore in Apr 2016

External links
 Jogen Chowdhury Artworks and Public Auction Prices and Economic Data
 "Jogen Chowdhury Profile,Interview and Artworks"

 "Gallerie Nvyā – Artist/ View all/ Jogen Chowdhury"
 The palette Art Gallery ''Jogen Chowdhury'''s biography and selected works.
 The CIMA Art Gallery ''Jogen Chowdhury'''s biography and selected works.
 Contemporary Indian Art ''Jogen Chowdhury'''s biography and selected works.
 Artnet.com ''Jogen Chowdhury'''s selected works on sale.

Artists from Kolkata
Bengali Hindus
Painters from West Bengal
1939 births
Indian male painters
Living people
Government College of Art & Craft alumni
University of Calcutta alumni
Academic staff of Visva-Bharati University
Indian art educators
Indian curators
École des Beaux-Arts alumni
Bengali male artists
Rajya Sabha members from West Bengal
20th-century Indian painters
West Bengal politicians
People from Faridpur District
Indian Hindus
Trinamool Congress politicians from West Bengal